Gertrude Constance Cockburn Benson ( Samwell; 26 February 1864 – 19 January 1946) was a British stage and film actress. Before her marriage to Frank Benson, she was known by the stage name Constance Featherstonhaugh, pronounced "Fanshaw".

Born in British India into a military family, and christened Gertrude Constance Cockburn Samwell, she took to the stage under the name of Featherstonhaugh, which was the middle name of her father, Morshead Featherstonhaugh Samwell. She married the actor Frank Benson in 1886, and they had two children, Eric William (1887–1916), killed at the battle of the Somme, and Brynhild Lucy (1888–1974).

When Benson played Cleopatra in 1898, reviewers were astonished by her "terrible rage", one commenting that she treated a struck-down messenger so violently that only the intervention of Charmian had saved his life. One critic later claimed that "Benson and his companies never shook off the aura of amateurism", and that some of the parts Constance Benson had played "owed more to her husband's loyalty than to her talent".

As an actress, Constance Benson worked in the theatre, but in 1911 she also appeared in leading roles in four silent films, all adaptations of William Shakespeare plays: Richard III, Julius Caesar, Macbeth, and The Taming of the Shrew.

In 1916 Constance became Lady Benson. After F. R. Benson's love affair with the young actress Genevieve Townsend (d. 1927), the couple separated but did not divorce, and in 1940 Benson attended her husband's funeral as his widow.

During the First World War, in which her son Eric was killed, Benson worked in a canteen for soldiers in France. In 1917 her daughter Brynhild married firstly Charles Chalmers,<ref>"Benson Brynhild L	 & Chalmers	Charles H L H" in Register of Marriages for Paddington Registration District vol. 1a (1917), p. 64</ref> in 1931 secondly Harold G. Janion, and in 1951 thirdly Richard C. Kelly.

In the 1920s, Benson became a writer, and her published books are her autobiography Mainly Players (1926); two novels, The Chimera (1928), about "an ice-cold, egotistical, twenty-eight-year-old artist", with a frustrated wife, and Cuckoo Oats (1929). She also wrote an acting manual and in the 1920s began a drama school, at which one of her students was Elvira Mullens, later Elvira Barney.

Benson's autobiography Mainly Players has an introduction by Arthur Machen, who had been a member of the Benson company from 1901 to 1909.

Publications
Lady Benson, Mainly Players: Bensonian Memories (London: Butterworth, 1926), with Introduction by Arthur MachenThe Chimera (London: Butterworth, 1928)Cuckoo Oats (London: Butterworth, 1929)
Lady Benson, One Hundred Practical Hints for the Amateur'' (London: Samuel French, 1930)

References

1864 births
1946 deaths
English silent film actresses
British people in colonial India
19th-century British actresses
British stage actresses
20th-century English actresses
19th-century English women
19th-century English people